Iwona Nina Matkowska-Sadowska (born 28 May 1982 in Żary) is a Polish freestyle wrestler. She competed in the freestyle 48 kg event at the 2012 Summer Olympics; after beating Patricia Bermúdez in the qualifications and Davaasükhiin Otgontsetseg in the 1/8 finals, she was defeated by Mariya Stadnik in the quarterfinals and eliminated by Clarissa Chun in the repechage round. In June 2015, she competed in the inaugural European Games, for Poland in wrestling, more specifically, Women's Freestyle in the 48 kilogram range. She earned a bronze medal.

In March 2021, she competed at the European Qualification Tournament in Budapest, Hungary hoping to qualify for the 2020 Summer Olympics in Tokyo, Japan.

References

External links
 

1982 births
Living people
Polish female sport wrestlers
Olympic wrestlers of Poland
Wrestlers at the 2012 Summer Olympics
Wrestlers at the 2016 Summer Olympics
People from Żary
Sportspeople from Lubusz Voivodeship
European Games medalists in wrestling
European Games bronze medalists for Poland
Wrestlers at the 2015 European Games
European Wrestling Championships medalists
World Wrestling Championships medalists
21st-century Polish women